Galina Sofina (born 7 March 1942) is a Soviet athlete. She competed in the women's pentathlon at the 1968 Summer Olympics.

References

1942 births
Living people
Athletes (track and field) at the 1968 Summer Olympics
Soviet pentathletes
Olympic athletes of the Soviet Union
Sportspeople from Kazan